Agatha Christie (1890–1976) was an English crime novelist, short-story writer and playwright. Her reputation rests on 66 detective novels and 15 short-story collections that have sold over two billion copies, an amount surpassed only by the Bible and the works of William Shakespeare. She is also the most translated individual author in the world with her books having been translated into more than 100 languages. Her works contain several regular characters with whom the public became familiar, including Hercule Poirot, Miss Marple, Tommy and Tuppence Beresford, Parker Pyne and Harley Quin. Christie wrote more Poirot stories than any of the others, even though she thought the character to be "rather insufferable". Following the publication of the 1975 novel Curtain, Poirot's obituary appeared on the front page of The New York Times. 

She married Archibald Christie in December 1914, but the couple divorced in 1928. After he was sent to the Western Front in the First World War, she worked with the Voluntary Aid Detachment and in the chemist dispensary, giving her a working background knowledge of medicines and poisons. Christie's writing career began during the war, after she was challenged by her sister to write a detective story; she produced The Mysterious Affair at Styles, which was turned down by two publishers before being published in 1920. Following the limited success of the novel, she continued to write and steadily built up a fan base. She went on to write over a hundred works, including further novels, short stories, plays, poetry, and two autobiographies. She also wrote six romantic novels under the pseudonym Mary Westmacott. 

One of Christie's plays, The Mousetrap, opened in West End theatre in 1952, and ran continuously until 16 March 2020, when the stage performances had to be temporarily discontinued during the COVID-19 pandemic. It then re-opened on 17 May 2021.  In 2009, the London run exceeded 25,000 performances. 

In September 2015, a public vote identified And Then There Were None—as the public's favourite Christie novel; the book was the writer's favourite, and the one she found most difficult to write.

In September 1930, Christie married the archaeologist Max Mallowan. The pair travelled frequently on archaeological expeditions, and she utilized the experiences she had while on her many adventures as a basis for some plots, including Murder on the Orient Express (1934), Murder in Mesopotamia (1936) and Death on the Nile (1937). She also wrote the autobiographical travel book Come, Tell Me How You Live (1946), which described their life in Syria.  Her biographer, Janet Morgan, reports that "archaeologists have celebrated ... [Christie's] contribution to Near Eastern exploration". Christie died in 1976, her reputation as a crime novelist high.

Novels

Initially in chronological order by UK publication date, even when the book was published first in the US or serialised in a magazine in advance of publication in book form.

Short-story collections

Many of Christie's stories first appeared in journals, newspapers and magazines. This list consists of the published collections of stories, in chronological order by UK publication date, even when the book was published first in the US or serialised in a magazine in advance of publication in book form.

{| class="wikitable plainrowheaders sortable" style="margin-right: 0;"
|+ Christie's short-story collections
|-
! scope="col" style="width: 13em;"| UK title
! scope="col"| Year of UKpublication
! scope="col"| UK publisher(All London)
! scope="col"| US title
! scope="col"| Year of USpublication
! scope="col"| US publisher(All New York)
! scope="col"| Series
|-
! scope="row" | Poirot Investigates
| 
| John Lane
| Poirot Investigates
| 
| Dodd, Mead & Co
| 
|-
! scope="row" | Partners in Crime
| 
| William Collins & Sons
| Partners in Crime
| 
| Dodd, Mead & Co
| Tommy and Tuppence
|-
! scope="row" | 
| 
| William Collins & Sons
| 
| 
| Dodd, Mead & Co
| 
|-
! scope="row" | 
| 
| William Collins & Sons
| 
| 
| Dodd, Mead & Co
| 
|-
! scope="row" | 
| 
| Odhams Press
| –
| –
| –
| –
|-
! scope="row" | 
| 
| William Collins & Sons
| –
| –
| –
| –
|-
! scope="row" | Parker Pyne Investigates
| 
| William Collins & Sons
| Mr. Parker Pyne, Detective
| 
| Dodd, Mead & Co
| 
|-
! scope="row" | Murder in the Mews
| 
| William Collins & Sons
| Dead Man's Mirror
| 
| Dodd, Mead & Co
| 
|-
! scope="row" | –
| –
| –
| 
| 
| Dodd, Mead & Co
| , Parker Pyne & Miss Marple
|-
! scope="row" | 
| 
| Vallencey
| 
| 
| Bantam Books
| Also called Problem at Sea
|-
! scope="row" | 
| 
| Bantam Books
| 
| 
| Bantam Books
| 
|-
! scope="row" | Poirot and the Regatta Mystery
| 
| Bantam Books
| Poirot and the Regatta Mystery
| 
| Bantam Books
| 
|-
! scope="row" | Poirot on Holiday
| 
| Todd
| –
| –
| –
| 
|-
! scope="row" | Problem at Pollensa Bay and The Christmas Adventure
| 
| Todd
| –
| –
| –
| 
|-
! scope="row" | 
| 
| Todd
| –
| –
| –
| 
|-
! scope="row" | Poirot Knows the Murderer
| 
| Todd
| –
| –
| –
| 
|-
! scope="row" | 
| 
| William Collins & Sons
| 
| 
| Dodd, Mead & Co
| 
|-
! scope="row" | –
| –
| –
| 
| 
| Dodd, Mead & Co
|  and others
|-
! –
| –
| –
| 
| 
| Dodd, Mead & Co
| 
|-
! scope="row" | –
| –
| –
| 
| 
| Dodd, Mead & Co
| –
|-
! scope="row" | 
| 
| William Collins & Sons
| –
| –
| –
| , Miss Marple and others
|-
! scope="row" | –
| –
| –
| Double Sin and Other Stories
| 
| Dodd, Mead & Co
| –
|-
! scope="row" | 13 for Luck! A Selection of Mystery Stories for Young Readers
| 
| William Collins & Sons
| 13 for Luck! A Selection of Mystery Stories for Young Readers
| 
| Dodd, Mead & Co
| –
|-
! scope="row" | –
| –
| –
| Surprise! Surprise!
| 
| Dodd, Mead & Co
| –
|-
! scope="row" | –
| –
| –
| 13 Clues for Miss Marple
| 
| Dodd, Mead & Co
| 
|-
! scope="row" | –
| –
| –
| 
| 
| Dodd, Mead & Co
| –
|-
! scope="row" | Poirot's Early Cases
| 
| William Collins & Sons
| Hercule Poirot's Early Cases
| 
| Dodd, Mead & Co
| 
|-
! scope="row" | Miss Marple's Final Cases and Two Other Stories
| 
| William Collins & Sons
| –
| –
| –
|  and others
|-
! scope="row" | Problem at Pollensa Bay and Other Stories
| 
| HarperCollins
| –
| –
| –
| , Parker Pyne & Harley Quin and others
|-
! scope="row" | While the Light Lasts and Other Stories
| 
| HarperCollins
| –
| –
| –
| –
|-
! scope="row" | –
| –
| –
| The Harlequin Tea Set
| 
| G. P. Putnam's Sons
| –
|-
! scope="row" | The Big Four (short-story version)| 
| HarperCollins
| –
| –
| –
| 
|}

List of short stories
A total of 166 stories have been written and published in 15 collections in the US and the UK. 164 stories were published in the UK, with the omission of "Three Blind Mice" and "The Wife of the Kenite.”  The 12 original short stories that were used for The Big Four were published in the UK in 2017. 153 other stories were published in the US, however, “Christmas Adventure,” which was the original version of "The Adventure of the Christmas Pudding” was not included.  Some stories were published under different names in the US collections.

Four short stories, including "The Submarine Plans,”  "Christmas Adventure,” "The Mystery of the Baghdad Chest,” and "The Second Gong,” were expanded into longer stories by Christie (respectively "The Incredible Theft,” "The Adventure of the Christmas Pudding,” "The Mystery of the Spanish Chest,” and "Dead Man's Mirror"). All four of the original versions were published in the UK, and three of them were published in the US (with "Christmas Adventure" being the exception).

UK collections
This is a list of 166 stories sorted by the 15 UK collections in chronological order.

US collections
There are 14 US collections, excluding Poirot's Early Cases, since all of its eighteen stories appeared in earlier collections, and The Last Séance: Tales of the Supernatural, which includes only one previously unavailable Christie story.

Miscellany

Broadcast works

Several of Christie's works have been adapted for stage and screen; the following is a list of only those works written by her on her own or as a member of a group.

Stage works

The definitive study of Agatha Christie's stage plays is Curtain Up: Agatha Christie, a Life in Theatre'' by Julius Green.

Notes and references

Notes

References

Sources

 

 

  

Bibliography
Bibliographies by writer
Bibliographies of British writers
Mystery fiction bibliographies
Agatha Christie